Sir Frank P. Lowy  (born 22 October 1930) is an Australian-Israeli businessman of Jewish Slovakian-Hungarian origins and the former long-time Chairman of Westfield Corporation, a global shopping centre company with billion of assets under management in the United States, United Kingdom and Europe.

In June 2018 Westfield Corporation was acquired by French company Unibail-Rodamco. He is a former Chairman of Scentre Group, the owner and manager of Westfield-branded shopping centres in Australia and New Zealand.

With an assessed net worth of billion in 2021, Lowy was ranked as the ninth richest Australian according to the Financial Review Rich List; having been the richest person in Australia during 2010. Forbes Asia magazine assessed Lowy's net worth at billion in January 2019 and placed him fourth in its Australia's 50 Richest people.

Lowy is the founder of the Lowy Institute, Australia's leading foreign affairs think tank, which has alternatively been described as "neoliberal", "centre-right" leaning or "reactionary". Lowy is also chairman of the Institute for National Securities Studies, an independent academic institute that studies key issues relating to Israel's national security and Middle East affairs.

Biography

Early life
Lowy was born in Czechoslovakia (in what is now Slovakia), and was forced to live in a ghetto in Hungary during World War II. He made his way to France in 1946, where he boarded the ship Yagur, heading for Mandatory Palestine. However, he was caught on route by the British authorities and interned in a detention camp in Cyprus. Lowy joined the Haganah, and then the Golani Brigade, and fought in the 1948 Arab–Israeli War in the Galilee and Gaza.

Career
In 1952, Lowy left Israel and joined his family, who had left Europe for Australia and started a business delivering small goods. In 1953, he met fellow immigrant John Saunders. The pair became business partners, eventually creating Westfield Development Corporation through the development of a shopping centre at Blacktown in Sydney's western suburbs. Over the next 30 years, Lowy and Saunders developed shopping centres across Australia and the United States (from 1977); and listed the company on the Australian Stock Exchange in 1960 as Westfield Development Corporation. Saunders sold his interests and left the company in 1987. In the 1990s Lowy took the company to New Zealand, then the United Kingdom in the 2000s.

Lowy was appointed a Director of the Reserve Bank of Australia in 1995, was reappointed in 2000 and 2003, and concluded his term in 2005. In 2008 Lowy and related interests were mentioned in documents stolen from the LGT Bank of Liechtenstein by a former employee. A subsequent US Senate probe and an Australian Taxation Office audit investigated Lowy and his sons, David and Steven, on their involvement with financial institutions in tax havens located in Liechtenstein and Switzerland. Lowy maintained he had not done anything wrong, the matter was settled with the ATO, and no action was taken.

After turning 80 in October 2010, Lowy officially stood down as Executive Chairman of the Westfield Group effective May 2011, taking on the role of non-executive chairman. Sons, Steven and Peter, became joint chief executives. In October 2015, Lowy stepped down as the chairman of the Scentre Group, a role that he had held for 55 years.

Personal life

Lowy married Shirley Rusanow in 1954, having met at a Jewish dance when he was 21. They have three sons, Peter and Steven, who managed the Westfield business, and David, who manages the family's private investments. His wife was the founder of the Chai Foundation which is dedicated to finding and funding research into effective but less toxic forms of cancer therapy. His son Peter, is chairman of Tribe Media Corp, the parent of the Jewish Journal and served as chairman of the University of Judaism.

In an Australian television production broadcast in 2010, called Family Confidential, it was revealed that Lowy had kept a secret about his survival in Nazi occupied Hungary. As a 13-year-old boy, Lowy had never known about the loss of his father, Hugo Lowy, who was beaten to death at Auschwitz concentration camp for refusing to leave his Jewish prayer shawl (Talit and Tefilin) behind. As a mark of respect to Hugo Lowy and other Hungarian Jews, Lowy commissioned the restoration of a railway wagon that had transported Hungarian Jews to Auschwitz, and placed the wagon on site at the former concentration camp. In April 2013, Lowy attended the March of the Living, where he shared the story of how his father perished during the Holocaust, with thousands of young students from around the world who had gathered in Auschwitz-Birkenau to observe Holocaust Remembrance Day.

Lowy moved to Israel at the end of 2018. Lady Lowy died in Tel Aviv in December 2020, after a long battle with dementia. In What Will Become of Us, a documentary screened at the 2019 Sydney Film Festival, Lowy spoke openly of the trauma of gradually losing his wife.

Net worth
Lowy has appeared on the Financial Review Rich List, formerly the BRW Rich 200 list, every year since it was first published in 1983. In 2010, the BRW magazine measured Lowy's net worth at 5.04 billion, making him Australia's richest person at that time. In 2016 his net worth was assessed as 8.26 billion on the BRW Rich 200 list; and the same net worth the following year when the list was renamed as the Financial Review Rich List.

Football in Australia

A long time supporter of Association football in Australia, Lowy was Chairman of the Football Federation Australia (FFA) from 2003 to November 2015. Some observers credit him and John O'Neill, a former rugby union executive, with resurrecting soccer in Australia. A televised  "A-League" is now in place, and the country has become a member of the Asian Football Confederation.

In 2007 Lowy commenced a campaign to host the 2022 FIFA World Cup in Australia backed with 43 million in support from the Australian Government. In 2010, amid allegations of bribery, politics, and back-scratching, FIFA awarded Qatar the rights to host the World Cup.

In 2015, he fell off a stage as the A-League trophy was due to be presented. In May 2015 he underwent surgery to resolve a complication that had arisen from the fall.

Lowy completed his term-limited period of leading the FFA, then handed over power to his son Steven. Steven remained in charge until significant changes in the structure of the FFA caused him to resign. Lowy also sold the last of his shares in Sydney FC at that time.

Philanthropy
Lowy has a reputation for giving of his time and financial support to a broad range of causes. He was awarded the title of Australia's leading philanthropist by peak body, Philanthropy Australia, with donations in 2002 of 10 million.

In April 2003 to mark the 50th anniversary of his arrival in Australia, Lowy established the Lowy Institute, an independent international policy think tank devoted to foreign affairs, and Australia's role in the world. It was reported that a gift of A$30 million was made to establish the Institute. Together with the Packer family, in 2008 Lowy donated an undisclosed amount towards the Victor Chang Cardiac Research Institute. In 2010, Lowy and his family donated 10 million to facilitate the construction of the UNSW Lowy Cancer Research Centre, a collaborative centre of the Children's Cancer Institute Australia and the Faculty of Medicine at the University of New South Wales.

Awards and recognition
In 2000, he was appointed a Companion of the Order of Australia for his service to the community through the development of the property industry and expansion of the retail sector in Australia and internationally, and as philanthropist committed to support of wide-ranging social and cultural endeavours. In 2002, he received the Golden Plate Award of the American Academy of Achievement presented by Awards Council member Ehud Barak in Dublin, Ireland. The establishment of the Lowy Institute led him to being awarded the Woodrow Wilson Award for Corporate Citizenship in 2005 by the Woodrow Wilson International Center for Scholars. On 2 October 2007 Lowy received the Henni Friedlander Award for the Common Good at Bowdoin College in Brunswick, Maine, United States. In 2008 Lowy was honoured by Australia Post for his contribution to philanthropy as one of the nation's five leading, living philanthropists with a commemorative postage stamp that was released on the eve of Australia Day as part of the Australian Legends series.

He was knighted in the 2017 Queen's Birthday Honours (UK) for services to business and philanthropy.

References

External links

1930 births
Living people
Australian billionaires
Australian Knights Bachelor
Australian Orthodox Jews
Australian people of Hungarian-Jewish descent
Australian people of Slovak-Jewish descent
Australian soccer chairmen and investors
Businesspeople from Sydney
Australian real estate businesspeople
Companions of the Order of Australia
Czechoslovak emigrants to Australia
Czechoslovak emigrants to Israel
Czechoslovak Jews
Directors and Presidents of the Art Gallery of New South Wales
Football Australia officials
Haganah members
Hungarian Jews
Israeli emigrants to Australia
Israeli Jews
Israeli people of Hungarian-Jewish descent
Israeli people of Slovak-Jewish descent
Naturalised citizens of Australia
People from Fiľakovo
Westfield Group
20th-century Australian businesspeople
21st-century Australian businesspeople
Australian philanthropists